The Holosporales are an order of bacteria.

References

Alphaproteobacteria
Bacteria orders